Fincha Airport  is an airport serving Fincha in Ethiopia.

See also
Transport in Ethiopia

References

OurAirports - Ethiopia
 Great Circle Mapper - Fincha
Fincha
Google Earth

Airports in Ethiopia